Stade Achille Hammerel is a football stadium in Verlorenkost, a quarter of Luxembourg City, in southern Luxembourg.  It is currently the home stadium of Racing FC Union Luxembourg.  Until 2005, it was the home of Union Luxembourg.  The stadium has a capacity of 5,814.

References

World Stadiums - Luxembourg

Achille Hammerel
Achille Hemmerel
Union Luxembourg